American Legion may refer to:

Military
 American Legion, a U.S. war veterans' organization
 American Legion (Great Britain), a British provincial regiment that served in the American Revolutionary War under the command of Benedict Arnold
 American Legion (CEF), the name given to units composed of Americans who served in the Canadian Expeditionary Force (CEF) during World War I
 97th Battalion (American Legion), CEF
 212th Battalion (American Legion), CEF
 237th Battalion (American Legion), CEF

Other uses
 SS American Legion (1919), a passenger ship
 American Legion Memorial Bridge (Michigan) in Traverse City, Michigan, United States
 American Legion Memorial Bridge (Potomac River), linking the western half of the Capital Beltway (I-495) between Maryland and Virginia, United States

See also
 American Legion Auxiliary
 American Legion Baseball
 Legion of the United States
 Sons of the American Legion
 List of military legions
 American Lesion, an album by Greg Gaffin